Palaeoproteus is an extinct genus of prehistoric salamanders erected by  in 1935. They have patchy stratigraphic occurrence which is due to their narrow climatic and environmental spaces.

See also
 List of prehistoric amphibian genera

References

Cenozoic salamanders
Fossil taxa described in 1935
Prehistoric amphibian genera
Fossils of Austria